The following is a list of municipalities in Asturias by area:

Asturias